The 2013 Porsche Tennis Grand Prix was a women's tennis tournament played on indoor clay courts. It was the 36th edition of the Porsche Tennis Grand Prix, and was part of the Premier tournaments of the 2013 WTA Tour. It took place at the Porsche Arena in Stuttgart, Germany, from April 22 until 28 April 2013. First-seeded  Maria Sharapova won her second consecutive singles title at the event.

Singles main draw entrants

Seeds 

 1 Rankings are as of April 15, 2013.

Other entrants 
The following players received wildcards into the singles main draw:
  Annika Beck
  Andrea Petkovic

The following players received entry from the qualifying draw:
  Nastassja Burnett
  Mirjana Lučić-Baroni
  Bethanie Mattek-Sands
  Dinah Pfizenmaier

Withdrawals 
  Tamira Paszek
  Klára Zakopalová

Retirements 
  Kirsten Flipkens (gastrointestinal illness)

Doubles main draw entrants

Seeds 

 Rankings are as of April 15, 2013.

Other entrants 
The following pairs received wildcards into the doubles main draw:
  Mona Barthel /  Sabine Lisicki
  Jelena Janković /  Mirjana Lučić-Baroni
  Angelique Kerber /  Andrea Petkovic
The following pair received entry as alternates:
  Jill Craybas /  Megan Moulton-Levy

Withdrawals 
Before the tournament
  Roberta Vinci (shoulder injury)

Finals

Singles 

 Maria Sharapova defeated  Li Na 6–4, 6–3
 It was Sharapova's 2nd title of the year and 29th of her career.

Doubles 

 Mona Barthel /  Sabine Lisicki defeated  Bethanie Mattek-Sands /  Sania Mirza, 6–4, 7–5

References

External links 
 

Porsche Tennis Grand Prix
Porsche Tennis Grand Prix
2013 in German tennis
2010s in Baden-Württemberg
Porsch